Aakasa Ramanna  is a 2010 Indian Telugu-language black comedy film which is a remake of a Hollywood movie, 11:14. This film is directed by G. Ashok, produced by Manyam Ramesh under Manyam Entertainments banner and starring Allari Naresh, Sivaji, Rajiv Kanakala, Meera Jasmine and Gowri Pandit in the lead roles. The film's soundtrack was composed by Chakri and Cinematography was handled by Sai Sriram. Dialogues for the film were written by Chandrashekar Gundimeda while Screenplay was handled also by G. Ashok. This was G. Ashok's second film as director. It marked the debut for editor Prawin Pudi. The film was released on 12 March 2010.

Plot
Akasa Ramanna, the narrator, starts with the story of Teja (Rajiv Kanakala), Raana (Allari Naresh), and Jai (Sivaji), The story also involves P. Timothy (Venu Madhav) and his lecherous friends. Raana is in search of getting credit of five lakh rupees to help his girl friend Isha (Gowri Pandit). He seeks his friend and a supermarket owner Jai's help. Jai himself being in financial crisis cannot help Raana. He is arrested by Inspector Ali (Rao Ramesh). Two murders happen to spice up the story. Ali suspects Teja of the murders. Teja is introduced to the concept of the inescapable trap of 'karma' by a fake godman Swamiji (Raghu Babu), in the local bar. In some minutes, the 'godman' is punished with death by 'karma,'. At the other end of the spectrum are Raana and Jai, who are taken for a ride by a treacherous woman. Raana is in dire need of the money, while Jai mysteriously needs the same amount. Timothy and gang are on their way to spend the night with their favorite prostitute. Meanwhile, Teja hits a person while driving the car in a drunken state.  There is a terrible link between the two, and the story rocks back and forth within a 40-minute duration leading to revealing the suspense. The entire film runs around just seven characters and is based on an incident that takes place at 12:40.

Cast 

 Allari Naresh as Raana
 Sivaji as Jai
 Rajiv Kanakala as Teja
 Meera Jasmine as Tara
 Gowri Pandit as Isha
 Venu Madhav as P. Timothy
 Rao Ramesh as Inspector Ali
 Naga Babu as Isha's father
 Sana as Isha's mother
 Raghu Babu as Swamiji
 Srinivasa Reddy as K.K.
 Satyam Rajesh as Yadav
 M. S. Narayana as Dr. Ekalingam
 Khayyum as Swamiji's assistant 
 Venu as Swamiji's assistant 
 Geetha Singh as Maggie
 Banda Jyothi as Banda Jyothi

Production and casting
The lead actors in the film Allari Naresh and Sivaji had previously worked together in 2008 film Pelli Kaani Prasad. After his unsuccessful debut as director with the film Flash News, G. Ashok made his comeback with this film. This was Allari Naresh's third release in the year. Apart from Naresh and Sivaji, Rajiv Kanakala does another important role in the film. Meera Jasmine is cast for the role of Tara and Gowri Pandit for the role of Isha. The film revolves around seven main characters and the film features prominent Telugu actors like Venu Madhav, Khayyum, Venu and Srinivas Reddy. Chandrashekar assisted Ashok with the dialogues in the film. Before release, the director disclosed that the film was made with the ‘reverse screenplay’ technique meaning the climax is shown first and the film then follows. The entire film runs around just seven characters and is based on an incident that takes place at 12.40. Filming of the film began in October 2008 and was completed in mid-2009. The film was delayed and was finally released on 12 March 2010. Shooting was predominantly done at nights as the story happens within a time span of 40 minutes. The main plot of the film was taken from 2003 Canadian film 11:14.

Release and reception
Aakasa Ramanna was released in India on 12 March 2010. The film was received with negative reviews. Deepa Garimella of fullhyderbad gave a 3 out of 10 rating for the film. Reviewer from Indiaglitz gave a mixed review for the film and said that Aakasa Ramanna is watchable but as a suspense flick the film fails. Radhika Rajamani from rediff gave the film 1.5 out of 5 and said that Aakasa Ramanna falters in execution. The film was a commercial failure at the box-office.

Soundtrack

The album consists of two songs, both written by lyricist Anantha Sreeram. The soundtrack was composed by music director Chakri.

References

External links 
 

2010 films
2010s Telugu-language films
Films scored by Chakri
Indian drama films
Indian remakes of American films